Palibhasa Lalake (Since He Is a Man/Because of Males) is a Philippine sitcom on ABS-CBN which ran from March 3, 1987, to November 9, 1998, and directed by Johnny Manahan.

Sypnopsis
The show began on March 3, 1987, with the original cast composed of Joey Marquez, Richard Gomez, Miguel Rodriguez, Gloria Romero, Cynthia Patag, and Amy Perez.

They were later joined by Carmina Villaroel (who then played Richard's younger sister, Cathy, a street smart tomboyish kid from the province, and Apa Ongpin (who played the role of a rich Castilian hunky nerd).

Over the years, many characters have come and gone, like Rene Requiestas (as Minerva's genius brother who is never taken seriously), John Estrada (as Johnny, a dumb hunk whose favorite endeavor is to invent things that never succeed). Later additions to the family was Gwapings member, Eric Fructuoso, who was first featured as a suitor of Cathy. Eventually the two other Gwapings members namely Mark Anthony Fernandez and Jomari Yllana were also added to the cast. They played regular teenage rascals always on the lookout for girls). Still later on, another bench brat joined in the fray, Jao Mapa.

Since the show was predominantly male, girls had to join in the fun too. Lindsay Custodio, Rica Peralejo, Jacqui Manzano and Regine Tolentino, then teenagers, were notable early guests. Claudine Barretto and G. Toengi also appeared as recurring guest stars in early years. In an effort to boost ratings, later seasons saw the addition of character foils, such as Tikboy (Anjo Yllana), a lovable semi-retardate in search of his long-lost mother.

After 11 years of airing, Palibhasa Lalake aired its final episode on November 9, 1998.

Cast

Regular
 Richard Gomez as Ricardo / Ricky (1987–1998)
 Joey Marquez as Joselito / Joey   (1987–1998)
 John Estrada as Juanito / Johnny (1990–1998)
 Miguel Rodriguez as Miguelito / Miggy (1987–1989) (Recurring guest thereafter)
 Anjo Yllana as Eroll, Tikboy (1994–1998)
 Gloria Romero as Tita Minerva Chavez
 Amy Perez as Amelia "Amy" Chavez
 Cynthia Patag as Cynthia Chavez
 Carmina Villaroel as Cathy (1987–1994)
 Apa Ongpin as Raffy
 Edu Manzano as Budoy
 Arlene Muhlach as Arlene

The Gwapings
 Mark Anthony Fernandez as Mark
 Eric Fructuoso as Eric
 Jomari Yllana as Jomari
 Jao Mapa as Jao

The Kutings
 Claudine Barretto as Tracey
 Rica Peralejo as Ashley
 G. Toengi as KC
 Regine Tolentino as Regine
 Lindsay Custodio as Sydney

Additionals
 Menggie Cobarrubias as Luis
 Malou Crisologo as Jessa
 John Lloyd Cruz as Rovic
 Rene Requiestas as Adonis
 Jacqui Manzano as Jacqui
 Antonio Aquitania as Anton
 Bonel Balingit as Hikapre (recurring) (1995–1998)
 Sarah Jane Ritter
 Bearwin Meily
 Gabby Eigenmann (1996–1997)
 Kevin Vernal
 Andrea del Rosario as Seksi
 Kristine Hermosa
 Ogie Diaz as Pekto (1992–1998)
 Bentong

Theme song
The theme song of the show is "Katawan", performed by Hagibis (composed by Mike Hanopol).

Reruns
The show's episodes are rerun over at Jeepney TV.

The show is streaming on iWant TFC and YouTube.

See also
List of shows previously aired by ABS-CBN
List of programs broadcast by Jeepney TV

References

External links 
 
 

ABS-CBN original programming
Philippine television sitcoms
1987 Philippine television series debuts
1998 Philippine television series endings
Filipino-language television shows